The Naha Port Facility, formerly the Naha Military Port, is a United States Forces Japan facility located in Naha, Okinawa, Japan, at the mouth of , which flows into the East China Sea.

The Naha Military Port was constructed by the U.S. troops after their landing on Okinawa Island in 1945. In 1950, Yarazamori Castle was demolished to make room for the port facility. It served as a logistic base during the Vietnam War. After the reversion of Okinawa from the United States to Japan in 1972, return of the land to the government of Japan was agreed at the 15th U.S.-Japan Security Consultative Committee held in 1974. A part of the land has been returned and the remaining land will be returned after the completion of planned move of the facility to Urasoe, Okinawa.

See also
Naval Base Okinawa

References 

Installations of the U.S. Department of Defense in Japan
United States Armed Forces in Okinawa Prefecture
Military installations established in 1945